Robert Barforth was Archdeacon of Barnstaple from 1478 to 1486.

References

Archdeacons of Barnstaple

15th-century English clergy